Dildarnagar is a town located in the Ghazipur district of the Indian state of Uttar Pradesh. It is situated on the banks of the River Ganges and is approximately 35 kilometers from the city of Ghazipur. The town is known for its historical and cultural significance, and it has several temples, mosques, and other landmarks that attract visitors from different parts of India. Dildarnagar is also an important commercial center and has a bustling market where locals and visitors can purchase a variety of goods and products. As of 2011 estimate the Population of Dildarnagar is 12855 and have an area of 1000 hectares.

History

Dildarnagar is on the road from Varanasi to Buxar and 27  km from Ghazipur. Between the town and the station there is mound called Akhandha, said to have been the seat of Raja Nal; the large tank to the west is called Rani Sagar after his famous queen Damayanti. Dildarnagar was founded in 1698 AD by a Rajput Kunwar Naval Singh who adopted Islam and kept his name Raja Deendar khan. Deendar khan kept the name as Deendarnagar but because of wrong pronunciation during the British rule over India the name of the village Dildarnagar during 1839 AD. Kunwar Naval Singh use to live in the village named Samohta located in Bihar state of India. One day Mughal emperor Aurangzeb passed to the village and adopted the brother of Naval Singh and kept his name Danish khan. After that whole family shifted to Lahore in Pakistan and adopted Islam and then came to Gazipur district and bought the village name as Akhanda in 592 coin used during Aurangzeb Empire in the year 1698 AD and started living there. Dildarnagar was made a town in year 1874AD when after Dildarnagar Junction railway station was built by the British government. Raja Deendaar Khan Build a Eid Gah in the village between 1700-1705 CE.

Agriculture and Infrastructure

Dildarnagar has a humid subtropical climate with large variations between summer and winter temperatures. The average annual rainfall is 1155 mm (44 in). Fog is common in the winters, while hot dry winds, called loo, blow in the summer. The geographical area of the apuborhood is 1000 hecaters. Business like Brick making, fertilizer and pesticides making, cattle-rearing, poultry farming, fish rearing is done in the town. The town also have personally owned oil mills, flower mills, rice mills, Dall mills and sugar mills.

Historical Population

Notable schools and colleges                                                                         

 Adarsh Vidyalaya Inter College
 Crescent Convent School                                                                                                                                                                                                                                 
 New Shah Faiz Public school
 Noble Senior Secondary School                                                                                                                                                                                                                                 
 SKBM Degree College

References

Dildarnagar
Populated places established in 1857